Vittabotys is a genus of moths of the family Crambidae. It contains only one species, Vittabotys mediomaculalis, which is found in China (Kwangtung).

References

Natural History Museum Lepidoptera genus database

Pyraustinae
Taxa named by Eugene G. Munroe
Crambidae genera
Monotypic moth genera